Yanis Danielov Karabelyov (born 23 January 1996) is a Bulgarian professional footballer who plays  as a midfielder for Hungarian club Kisvárda and the Bulgarian national team.

Career

Slavia Sofia
Karabelyov joined Slavia Sofia at the age of seven. He made his senior debut for the club on 28 September 2013, replacing Fernando Silva for the final 12 minutes of an A Group match against Levski Sofia at Ovcha Kupel Stadium. On 17 May 2014, Karabelyov scored his first goal in a 2–0 home win over Pirin Gotse Delchev. One year later, he started in the A Group for first time in a 3–1 home loss against Cherno More Varna on 22 May 2015.

Karabelyov began to establish himself in the Slavia first team from the 2015–16 season.

Tsarsko Selo (loan)
On 6 September 2017, he was loaned to Tsarsko Selo until the end of the year, but on 8 January 2018 Slavia shorted his loan and he returned in train with the team.

Kisvárda
On 19 December 2020 he joined the Hungarian team Kisvárda.

International career
Karabelyov was called up to the Bulgaria U21 squad in August 2015, aged 19. He made his debut on 9 October 2015 against Armenia U21. In that match, he came as a substitute in the 81st minute, and Bulgaria won the match 2–0.

On 7 March 2016, Karabelyov was called up for the first time to the senior Bulgarian squad for friendly matches against Portugal and against Macedonia.

He made his debut on 7 June 2019 in a Euro 2020 qualifier against Czech Republic, as a 64th-minute substitute for Kristiyan Malinov.

Statistics
As of 23 September 2022

Honours
Slavia Sofia
 Bulgarian Cup (1): 2017–18

References

External links

1996 births
Living people
Bulgarian footballers
Bulgaria youth international footballers
Bulgaria under-21 international footballers
Bulgaria international footballers
PFC Slavia Sofia players
FC Tsarsko Selo Sofia players
Kisvárda FC players
Nemzeti Bajnokság I players
First Professional Football League (Bulgaria) players
Second Professional Football League (Bulgaria) players
Association football midfielders
Expatriate footballers in Hungary
Bulgarian expatriate sportspeople in Hungary
Footballers from Sofia